The fourth and final season of the Attack on Titan anime television series, subtitled Attack on Titan: The Final Season, was produced by MAPPA, chief directed by Jun Shishido, and directed by Yuichiro Hayashi, replacing Tetsurō Araki and Masashi Koizuka, respectively. Scriptwriter Hiroshi Seko fully took over the series composition from Yasuko Kobayashi, and Tomohiro Kishi replaced Kyōji Asano as character designer due to the series switching production studios.  The season covers the "Marley" (chapters 91–106) and "War for Paradis" (chapters 107–139) arcs from the original manga by Hajime Isayama.

The season introduces Gabi Braun and Falco Grice, young Eldian Warrior candidates seeking to inherit Reiner's Armored Titan four years after the failed mission to reclaim the Founding Titan. While Marley plans to invade Paradis to strengthen their weakening military and retrieve the Founding Titan, the Survey Corps lay an attack in their homeland. As Marley and the Paradis forces go to war in Marley and the Shiganshina District, both sides sustain a heavy death toll while Gabi and Falco are forced to confront their internal tensions about the supposed "devils" of Paradis. In the second part of the season, aware of the global anti-Eldian sentiment resulting from Marleyan propaganda, Eren Jaeger preemptively targets the world outside of Paradis with the Rumbling, unleashing millions of Colossal-like Wall Titans in a widespread effort to kill all life beyond the island. In the third and final part of the season, the Alliance led by members of the Survey Corps and Warrior Unit head to Marley in order to stop Eren's Founding Titan and end the Rumbling.  

The first part of the season aired on NHK General TV from December 7, 2020, to March 29, 2021, at 12:10 a.m. JST. In the United States, Adult Swim's Toonami programming block began airing Funimation's English dub on January 10, 2021, at 12:30 a.m. EST/PST. In Southeast Asia, the subbed series was released on iQiyi. A second part aired on NHK General TV from January 10 to April 4, 2022, at 12:05 a.m. JST. A third and final part, subtitled The Final Chapters, will air in two halves; the first half, a one-hour special, premiered on March 4, 2023, at 12:25 a.m. JST while the second half will debut in fall 2023.

The score is directed by Masafumi Mima and composed by Hiroyuki Sawano and Kohta Yamamoto. For Part 1, the opening theme is  performed by Shinsei Kamattechan, and the ending theme is  performed by Yūko Andō. For Part 2, the opening theme is "The Rumbling" performed by SiM, and the ending theme is  performed by Ai Higuchi. For the first special of Part 3, the ending theme is "Under the Tree" performed by SiM.

The season, like the seasons before it, has received universal acclaim. Particular praise has gone to its shift in focus, time jump, action sequences, plot developments, character arcs (especially Eren and Reiner’s), voice acting, and tension; with Part 1 being praised for its character work, action sequences, writing and tone, and Part 2 being praised for its surreal tone, humour, action and writing. Part 3 has received similar acclaim, for its animation, music, voice acting, emotional scenes and the dark terrifying portrayal of the Rumbling.



Episode list

Music

The soundtrack was composed by Kohta Yamamoto (on tracks 1–20), and Hiroyuki Sawano (on tracks 21–23), and was released on June 23, 2021, by Pony Canyon. It was released digitally on several sites including Apple Music and Spotify. It contains 23 tracks, with two vocal tracks featuring performances by cumi and Hannah Grace.

Track listing

Home media release

Japanese

English

Notes

References

External links
  

Attack on Titan episode lists
Anime postponed due to the COVID-19 pandemic
Split television seasons
2020 Japanese television seasons
2021 Japanese television seasons
2022 Japanese television seasons
2023 Japanese television seasons
MAPPA